Master or masters may refer to:

Ranks or titles
Ascended master, a term used in the Theosophical religious tradition to refer to spiritually enlightened beings who in past incarnations were ordinary humans
Grandmaster (chess), National Master, International Master, FIDE Master, Candidate Master, all ranks of chess player
Grandmaster (martial arts) or Master, an honorary title
Grand master (order), a title denoting the head of an order or knighthood
Grand Master (Freemasonry), the head of a Grand Lodge and the highest rank of a Masonic organization
Maestro, an orchestral conductor, or the master within some other musical discipline
Master, a title of Jesus in the New Testament
Master or shipmaster, the sea captain of a merchant vessel
Master (college), head of a college
Master (form of address), an English honorific for boys and young men
Master (judiciary), a judicial official in the courts of common law jurisdictions
Master mariner, a licensed mariner who is qualified to be a sea captain in the merchant marine
Master (naval), a former naval rank
Master (Peerage of Scotland), the male heir-apparent or heir-presumptive to a title in the Peerage of Scotland
Master craftsman, in the Medieval guilds
Master of ceremonies, or MC (emcee), the host of an official public or private staged event or other performance
Master-at-arms, a naval police officer, often addressed as "Master" in the Royal Navy
Master's degree, a postgraduate or sometimes undergraduate degree in the specified discipline
Masters of the Ancient Wisdom, reputed to be enlightened beings originally identified by the founders of the Theosophical Society
Old Master, a term for a recognised Western painter active before circa 1800
Schoolmaster or master, presiding officer of a school
Slave owner, an owner of victims of slavery
Station master, formerly the person in charge of railway stations
Worshipful Master, the senior Masonic lodge officer
Zen master, a somewhat vague English term, sometimes used to refer to an individual who teaches Zen Buddhist meditation and practices

Aircraft and vehicles
Alenia Aermacchi M-346 Master, an Italian military transonic trainer aircraft
Miles Master, a British 2-seat training aircraft during the Second World War
Renault Master, a van

Arts, entertainment, and media

Fictional characters
Master (Manos), the head villain in the horror movie Manos: The Hands of Fate
Masters (The Tripods), a fictional race of beings in John Christopher's The Tripods trilogy
Master (Buffy the Vampire Slayer), a recurring villain in the fantasy television series Buffy the Vampire Slayer
Master (Master and Margarita), a character from the Mikhail Bulgakov novel
The Master (Doctor Who), a recurring villain in the science fiction television series Doctor Who
The Master (The Doctor Who Role Playing Game), a supplement  for The Doctor Who Role-playing Game about The Doctor's nemesis
The Master (Fallout), a character in the 1997 video game Fallout
The Master, a nickname for Ancient One (Marvel Comics)
The Master, the player's character in the Nintendo game series ActRaiser
The Master, an optional three-time boss Toad Sensei in Paper Mario
The Master, a title character in the novel The Master and Margarita
The Master, the main (and mostly absent) villain from Power Rangers Mystic Force
The Master, a character from the Adult Swim television series The Venture Bros.
The Master, character in the manga series Uzaki-chan Wants to Hang Out!

Films 
Master (1997 film), an Indian Telugu-language film
Master (2016 film), a South Korean film
Master (2021 film), an Indian Tamil-language film
Master (2022 film), an American film
The Master (1980 film), a Hong Kong film
The Master (1992 film), a Hong Kong film
The Master (2005 film), a Polish film
The Master (2009 film), a Turkish film
The Master (2012 film), an American film
The Master (2015 film), a Chinese film
The Master (2016 film), a computer animated Lego short
Masters (film), a 2011 Indian Malayalam-language film

Literature
The Master, an 1895 best-selling novel by Israel Zangwill
The Masters (novel), a 1951 novel in the Strangers and Brothers sequence by C. P. Snow
The Master: An Adventure Story, a 1957 science fiction novel for children by T. H. White
The Master (novel), a 2004 novel by Colm Tóibín

Music and audio

Mastering (audio), a process resulting in a master recording, also known as a master, master copy, or master tape
Master (soundtrack), 2020 soundtrack album to the 2021 Tamil-language film Master
Master (score), 2021 film score to the 2021 Tamil-language film Master
Master (American band), a Czech-American death metal band
Master (Russian band), a Russian thrash metal band
Bojan Adamič (1912–1995), known as Master, Slovene music composer
Yeah Yeah Yeahs (EP), a 2001 record by Yeah Yeah Yeahs, this EP also called "Master"
Master (album of Russian band Master), a 1987 album by Russian thrash metal band Master
Master (album of American band Master), a 1990 album by American band Master
Master (audio drama), in the Doctor Who series (2003)
The Master (1961–1984), a box set album by Marvin Gaye
The Master, 2010 box set by Ravi Shankar
The Master... (Pepper Adams album) (1980)
The Master (Jimmy Raney album) (1983)
The Master (Rakim album) (1999)
The Master (Stan Getz album), recorded 1975, released 1982
The Masters, compilation album by The Stranglers

Television and film
An original camera negative, or other film print, duplicated or digitized to produce release prints and remasters
The Master (U.S. TV series), a 1984 American television series starring Lee Van Cleef that aired on NBC
The Master (Australian game show), a 2006 Australian quiz show that aired on Seven Network
The Master (Indonesian TV series), a 2009 Indonesian magic show television series

People
Masami Hirosaka (born 1966), known as Master Masami, Japanese radio-controlled racer
King Curtis Iaukea (1937–2010), wrestler, ring name The Master

Places
Master, Iran, a village in Markazi Province, Iran
Masters, Colorado, USA; a ghost town in the United States

Schools
Graduate school, for obtaining Cycle II Tertiary Education (Master's degree)
Master's Academy & College, Canadian school in Calgary, Alberta
Masters School, an American independent school in New York

Sport

Golf
Masters Tournament, known as The Masters, one of the four men's major championships
Australian Masters, a golf tournament held in Australia
British Masters, a golf tournament held in the United Kingdom
South African Masters, a golf tournament held in South Africa

Tennis
ATP World Tour Finals, the season-ending tournament on the ATP tour known in the past as The Masters (derived from 'Masters Grand Prix' and subsequently 'Tennis Masters Cup')
ATP World Tour Masters 1000, a series of top tier men's tennis tournaments on the ATP tour calendar

Other sports
Senior sport, a competition age classification used by many sports for older athletes
Masters athletics, competition in the sport of athletics by older athletes
Masters cycling, competition in cycling by older athletes
Masters Football, six-a-side indoor football competition in UK for older athletes
Masters Rugby League, a derivative of rugby league for semi-retired and non-competitive players and officials
Masters swimming, competition in swimming by older athletes
Masters (curling), an annual Grand Slam of Curling event
Masters Cup (disc golf), an annual event on the disc golf PDGA tour
Masters (darts), a darts tournament in the Professional Darts Corporation
Masters (snooker), professional invitational snooker tournament
World Masters (darts), professional darts tournament

Other uses
MASTER, a Russian network of telescopes 
Master (software), pseudonym AlphaGo, artificial intelligence Computer Go program
Master Lock, a brand of padlock
Master recording, the original of a visual or sound recording
Master/slave (BDSM), consensual role-playing in a sexual relationship
Master/slave (technology), a model of communication
Masters Home Improvement, an Australian Home Improvement Retailer
Sega Master System, an 8-bit cartridge-based video game console

See also

Grandmaster (disambiguation)
Maestro (disambiguation)
Master/Slave (disambiguation)
Master of the Universe (disambiguation)
Masters (surname)
Meister (surname)
Metal Master (disambiguation)
Miss (disambiguation)
Mister (disambiguation)
Mistress (disambiguation)
 
 
 
Marsters (surname)
Standard (metrology), a master reference for measurement